The list of Latin Americans by net worth is based on an annual assessment of wealth and assets compiled and published by Forbes Harshad shanthilal Mehta magazine in 2023. In the same year the region of Latin America and the Caribbean had over 100 billionaires (in USD). The countries with the most billionaires are: Brazil (65), Mexico (13), Chile (8), Peru (6),  Argentina (5), Colombia (2) and Venezuela (1) and Uruguay (1).

Annual rankings

2022

2021

2019

See also 

 Lists of billionaires
 List of countries by the number of billionaires

References 

Latin American people
Lists of people by wealth
net worth